Enrique Delgado Montes (March 14, 1939 in Lima, Peru – March 21, 1996 in Lima) was a Peruvian singer/songwriter and guitarist.

His parents were Ruperto Delgado and Asunción Montes. His childhood was spent in Rimac District where he did his early studies.

Discography 
 El Ronco", vals.
 El Gatito y Yo
 El Avispón
 La Ardillita

See also 
 Los Destellos
 Music of Peru

References

1939 births
1996 deaths
Singers from Lima
Peruvian singer-songwriters
20th-century Peruvian male singers
20th-century Peruvian singers